Ebrima "Ebou" Adams (born 15 January 1996) is a professional footballer who plays as a midfielder for EFL Championship club Cardiff City and the Gambia national team.

He began his career at Conference National club Dartford, before gaining regular football and attracting interest from Football League clubs while on loan at Walton Casuals. Adams joined Norwich City in February 2016, and had loan spells at National League side Braintree Town and EFL League One club Shrewsbury Town.

In November 2017, Adams was called up to represent the Gambian national team. The English-born midfielder qualified through his parents and made his debut against Morocco B.

Early life 
Adams was born in Greenwich and attended The John Roan School. After playing his youth football at Sutcliffe Rangers Fc, he joined Dartford's youth ranks at the age of 15. He moved up to the Dartford Academy in August 2012.

Club career

Dartford 
On 26 April 2014, Adams made his Dartford debut with a 29-minute appearance in a 3–1 defeat to Nuneaton Town. Following his loan at Walton Casuals, he became a regular in the first team set-up and made 16 appearances during the 2015–16 season prior to his departure.

Walton Casuals (loan) 
On 14 September 2014, he joined Isthmian Division One South club Walton Casuals on loan alongside Dartford teammates Kieran Scantlebury and Bode Anidugbe. He scored his first goal for the club in a 5–4 defeat to Whitstable Town the following month. Adams also scored in a 2–0 victory at home to Chipstead in March 2015.

Norwich City 
On 1 February 2016, Adams joined Norwich City on an 18-month contract for an undisclosed fee, becoming Dartford's record sale. He immediately joined up with the Under-23s and made his youth team debut in a 7–0 defeat to a Manchester United team including Sergio Romero, Phil Jones and Memphis Depay.

Adams faced a tough start to life in the professional game with subsequent Premier League 2 appearances against Chelsea, Manchester City and Tottenham Hotspur. He finished the season with nine Premier League 2 appearances and one assist.

Adams scored his first goal for the club in November 2016, completing a 4–1 win over MK Dons in the EFL Trophy. On 6 March 2017, he scored his first goal of the Premier League 2 campaign with the winning strike in a 2–1 victory at Newcastle United.

Braintree Town (loan) 
In December 2016, Adams moved to National League club Braintree Town on a one-month youth loan. On 17 December, he made his debut from the bench in a 1–1 draw at Gateshead. Completing a full 90 minutes in a 1–0 win at Boreham Wood three days later, Adams was dismissed in the 73rd minute of a 3–2 win over Dagenham & Redbridge. A three-game suspension meant he was unable to feature again during his loan.

Shrewsbury Town (loan) 
On 26 June 2017, he joined League One side Shrewsbury Town on a six-month loan. After being named as an unused substitute on the opening day of the season, Adams' debut – a 2–1 EFL Cup exit against Nottingham Forest – proved to be his only defeat with the club. He made his league debut shortly after with an eight-minute appearance from the bench in a 1–0 victory at AFC Wimbledon. He made a further four league appearances all from the bench, although three came in injury time. Adams recorded just 20 minutes of league action during his time with the club, with his final league appearance coming in a 1–1 draw with Blackburn Rovers on 23 September.

Adams also made two appearances in the EFL Trophy, assisting Louis Dodds for the final goal in a 3–0 victory over West Bromwich Albion U23s on 3 October. The match proved to be his final appearance for the club. In his eight appearances for the club, Adams was involved in a single loss – a 2–1 EFL Cup exit against Nottingham Forest on his debut.

On 8 January 2018, Adams returned to parent club Norwich City.

Leyton Orient (loan) 
On 9 January 2018, he joined National League side Leyton Orient on loan for the remainder of the season.

Ebbsfleet United 
On 1 June 2018, Adams joined National League side Ebbsfleet United.

Forest Green Rovers 
On 18 June 2019, Adams moved to League Two club Forest Green Rovers on a two-year deal.

Cardiff City 
On 13 May 2022, it was announced Adams would join Championship club Cardiff City on a three-year deal on 1 July.

International career
Born in England to Gambian parents, Adams debuted for the Gambia national team in November 2017 against Morocco B.
He played in the 2021 Africa cup of Nations, his national team's first continental tournament, where they made a sensational quarter-final.

Career statistics

Honours
Forest Green Rovers
League Two: 2021–22

Individual
PFA Team of the Year: 2021–22 League Two

References

External links

1996 births
Living people
People with acquired Gambian citizenship
English people of Gambian descent
Gambian footballers
English footballers
Association football midfielders
The Gambia international footballers
2021 Africa Cup of Nations players
English Football League players
National League (English football) players
Isthmian League players
Dartford F.C. players
Walton Casuals F.C. players
Norwich City F.C. players
Braintree Town F.C. players
Shrewsbury Town F.C. players
Leyton Orient F.C. players
Ebbsfleet United F.C. players
Forest Green Rovers F.C. players
 Cardiff City F.C. players
Black British sportspeople